Groß-Schweinbarth is a town in the district of Gänserndorf in the Austrian state of Lower Austria.

Geography
Groß-Schweinbarth lies in the hills between Bad Pirawarth and Gänserndorf in Lower Austria. About 46.3 percent of the municipality is forested.

References

Cities and towns in Gänserndorf District